Hadley Learning Community is a coeducational all-through school for students from 5 – 16 years of age located in the community of Hadley in central Telford.

The school opened on 1 September 2006 and is a £70 million PFI project, in partnership with Interserve. The campus consists of a Primary, Secondary and two special schools:
 900 place secondary phase for 11-16 year olds, with 180 students in each year group, currently transitioning from this to 1200 places with 24p students in each year group as of September 2020 intake. This transition will be completed within 5 years.
 420 place primary phase for 5-11 year olds with 60 children, in two classes, in each year group.
 160 place Special School, The Bridge, which is co-located on the campus, for children with severe and profound disabilities.
 40 place Special School, Queensway, for children who have an SEN statement with a diagnosis of autistic spectrum disorder (ASC)
 60 place Local Authority Nursery, which has a morning and afternoon session for 30 children
 A Family Centre for children's services and an early intervention team
 ABC Nursery, which is privately run but works with HLC
 Community facilities, called The Circle, for sports which includes a swimming pool and fitness suite as well as a Public Library, Coffee shop, Theatre and Dance Studio all used by the public during the day, evenings, weekends and holidays.

Previously a community school administered by Telford and Wrekin Council, in March 2018 Hadley Learning Community converted to academy status. The school is now sponsored by the Learning Community Trust.

References

External links
Official website

Secondary schools in Telford and Wrekin
Academies in Telford and Wrekin
Schools in Telford
Educational institutions established in 2006
Primary schools in Telford and Wrekin
2006 establishments in England